Slobodka is a rural locality (a village) in Markushevskoye Rural Settlement, Tarnogsky District, Vologda Oblast, Russia. The population was 22 as of 2002.

Geography 
Slobodka is located 24 km southeast of Tarnogsky Gorodok (the district's administrative centre) by road. Shevelevskaya is the nearest rural locality.

References 

Rural localities in Tarnogsky District